Volodymyr Ivanovych Yurchyshyn (27 July 1934 – 17 August 2010) was a Ukrainian graphic artist, book designer, Honoured Artist of Ukraine (1990), winner of Shevchenko National Prize (1990) for the design of the book "Litopys Rus'kyi" ("Primary Chronicle") (1989).

Biography
Born July 27, 1935 (other sources – 1934) in the village of Dakhniv, in the San region, now in Poland, in the family of Ivan and Varvara (née Pekar) Yurchyshyn. In September 1945, the artist's family was deported to Soviet Ukraine.

From 1952 to 1957, he studied at the Ivan Fedorov Ukrainian Polygraphic Institute in L'viv (where his teacher was V. Forostetskyi), and he was also influenced by the works of Olena Kul'chyts'ka. After graduation he worked for the Kiev publishing houses "Naukova dumka", "Mystetstvo", "Vyshcha shkola", "Dnipro", and also for the journals "Narodna tvorchist' ta etnohrafiia" and "Obrazotvorche mystetstvo". He was significantly influenced by P. Popov, the well-known specialist in old Ukrainian engraving, the famous scholar V. Sventsits'ka, and the masters of Ukrainian folk art.

He worked primarily in book design. Over a period of half a century, he developed and designed a huge number of publications, including works by  T. Shevchenko, "Povist' mynulykh lit" (1982), "Litopys" by S. Velychko (1991), O. Il'chenko's novel "Kozats'komu rodu nema perevodu" (1967), collections of Ukrainian songs "Ukrains'ki pisni vydani М. Maksymovychem" (1962), "Zakarpats'ki pisni ta kolomyiky" (1965), "Narodni pisni Bukovyny v zapysakh Iuriia Fed'kovycha" (1968), "Pisni z polonyny" (1970), "Narodni perlyny" (1971), "Narodni pisni v zapysakh Lesi Ukrainky ta z ii spivu" (1971), "Ukrains'ki pisni u zapysakh Osypa i Fedora Bodians'kykh" (1978), the academic studies by V. Sventsits'ka "Ivan Rutkovych" (1966), by O. Bilets'kyi "Ukrains'kyi portretnyi zhyvopys XVII-XVIII stolit'" (1969), by M. Dragan "Ukrains'ka dekoratyvna riz'ba XVI-XVIII st." (1970), by Ia. Zapasko "Mystets'ka stadshchyna Ivana Fedorova" (1974), by Ia. Zapasko, Ia. Isaevych "Pamia'tky knyzhkovoho mystetstva" (1981–1984), by Z. Tarakhan-Bereza "Shevchenko – poet i khudozhnyk" (1985), by V. Ovsiichuk "Maistry ukrains'koho barokko. Zhovkivs'kyi kul'turnyi oseredok" (1991), by S. Bilokin' "Masovyi teror iak zasib derzhavnoho upravlinnia v SRSR" (1999) and others, catalogues of art exhibitions.

He skilfully made use of ornamental motifs in adding to modern books the heritage of old Ukrainian engraving and folk pictures.  The designs of Volodymyr Yurchyshyn are a unique phenomenon in Ukrainian book art, where carefully integrated manuscript and typeset texts, geometric and floral ornaments are all united as one clear constructive concept.

Apart from his work with books, he created many independent compositions – "The Family" (1988–1994), "Faith through the thorny road" (1978–1995), the series "Dumy" (1974–1979), "Owls" (2007–2008), the poster "1814–1861" (2008), dedicated to  T. Shevchenko, and others.

He was one of the developers of modern Ukrainian scripts.

Gallery

References
 Slovnyk khudozhnykiv Ukrainy. Kiev, 1973. – С.264;
 Myttsi Ukrainy. Kyiv, 1992. – С.670;
 Mystetstvo Ukrainy: Bibliohrafichnyi dovidnyk. Kyiv, 1997. — С.670;
 Sanots'ka Kh. Oderzhymist'. — Obrazotvorche mystetstvo, 1999, 3–4. — С.44–45;
Kubiyovych, Volodymyr, (ed.). Encyclopedia Ukrainoznavstva (Encyclopedia of Ukrainian studies), vol. 10. L'viv, 2000. – С.3948;
 Khto e khto v Ukraini. Kyiv, 2000. – С.557;
 Shevchenkivs'ki laureaty: 1962—2001. Kyiv, 2001. — С.650—651;
 Na mezhi ІІ-ІІІ tysiacholit': Khudozhnyky Kyeva. Kyiv, 2009. — С.509, ill. 1129, 1130.
 Volodymyr Yurchyshyn. Book art. Selected works from the collection of the Museum of the Book and Printing of Ukraine. Compilers of the catalogue: Viktoriya Belyba, Nataliia Globa, Anna Dovbush, Halyna Yemets, Hanna Sokyrina. Introduction: Ihor Dudnyk, Valentyna Bochkovsʹka. Kyiv, 2015.

Awards and Prizes
 Shevchenko National Prize

1935 births
2010 deaths
People from Lubaczów County
People from Lwów Voivodeship
Ukrainian Academy of Printing alumni
Ukrainian artists
Victims of post–World War II forced migrations